John Russell Sprague (December 24, 1886 – April 17, 1969) was the Republican county executive of Nassau County, New York from 1938 until 1953. He also was a delegate to the Republican National Convention in 1936, 1940, 1944, 1948, 1952, and 1956 and part of Republican National Committee from New York during 1940–1948.

Life 
Born in Inwood, New York, Sprague was an instrumental politician in Nassau County. He took center stage in adopting a county charter that created the position of county executive. In 1938, he was the first person elected to that office. Prior to serving as county executive, Sprague worked as a lawyer in Far Rockaway. 

By the end of his time serving as county executive in 1953, Sprague lived in Roslyn Estates, New York.

References

External links
 http://politicalgraveyard.com/bio/sprague.html

1886 births
1969 deaths
People from The Five Towns, New York
Cornell Law School alumni
New York (state) lawyers
Nassau County Executives
New York (state) Republicans
20th-century American politicians
20th-century American lawyers